It's About Time may refer to:

Books
 It's About Time: Understanding Einstein's Relativity, a 2005 book by N. David Mermin

Film
 It's About Time, a film that received the 1993 Academy of Canadian Cinema and Television Diversity Award
 It's About Time, a film shown at the 2001 Toronto International Film Festival
 It's About Time, a 2005 film featuring Richard Easton
 It's About T.I.M.E., a 2019 musical film by Sticky Fingaz
 The Last Sharknado: It's About Time, a 2018 television film

Television
 It's About Time (TV series), a 1966–1967 American sitcom
 "It's About Time" (My Little Pony: Friendship Is Magic), an episode
 "It's About Time" (The Penguins of Madagascar), an episode
 "It's About Time!" (Phineas and Ferb), an episode

Music

Albums
 It's About Time (Chic album), 2018
 It's About Time (CSULA album) or the title song, 1990
 It's About Time (Christina Milian album), 2004
 It's About Time (Danny Boy album), 2010
 It's About Time (George Russell album) or the title song, 1997
 It's About Time (Hank Williams Jr. album) or the title song, 2016
 It's About Time (Jimmy Hamilton album), 1961
 It's About Time (John Denver album) or the title song, 1983
 It's About Time (Jonas Brothers album), 2006
 It's About Time (Julie Reeves album) or the title song, 1999
 It's About Time (Kenny Loggins album) or the title song, 2003
 It's About Time (Manu Katché album), 1992
 It's About Time (Marc Ford album), 2002
 It's About Time (McCoy Tyner & Jackie McLean album) or the title song, 1985
 It's About Time (Morris Day album), 2004
 It's About Time (Morrissey–Mullen album) or the title song, 1983
 It's About Time (The Pandoras album) or the title song, 1984
 It's About Time (SWV album) or the title song, 1992
 It's About Time (Teddy Edwards album), 1960
 It's About Time (Tonto's Expanding Head Band album), 1974
 It's About Time (Tracy Byrd album) or the title song, 1999
 It's About Time, by Donaldson, Moir and Paterson, 1999
 It's About Time, by Doof, 2000
 It's About Time, by Paulette Carlson, 2006
 It's About Time, by Shane Yellowbird, 2009

Songs 
 "It's About Time" (Beach Boys song), 1970
 "It's About Time" (Lillix song), 2003
 "It's About Time" (Young the Giant song), 2013
 "It's About Time", by H. P. Lovecraft from H. P. Lovecraft II, 1968
 "It's About Time", by Jamie Cullum from Twentysomething, 2003
 "It's About Time", by the Lemonheads from Come on Feel the Lemonheads, 1993
 "It's About Time", by Linda Ronstadt from Hand Sown ... Home Grown, 1969
 "It's About Time", by One Night Only from Started a Fire, 2008
 "It's About Time", by Public Announcement from All Work, No Play, 1998
 "It's About Time", by Van Halen from The Best of Both Worlds, 2004

Video games
Crash Bandicoot 4: It's About Time, a 2020 platform game
Plants vs. Zombies 2: It's About Time, a 2013 tower-defense game

See also
 About Time (disambiguation)